The 14th CMAS Underwater Photography World Championship was held from April 9 – 14, 2013 in Cuba at Cayo Largo.  David Barrio of Spain was announced as the CMAS World Champion in underwater photography for 2013 and received the gold medal while runners-up Stefano Proakis and Michele Davino both representing Italy respectively received the silver and bronze medals.

Organisation
The Federacion Cubana de Actividades Subacuaticuas (English: Cuban Federation of Underwater Activities) (FCAS) hosted the championship on behalf of the Confédération Mondiale des Activités Subaquatiques (CMAS) with assistance from the Ministry of Tourism of Cuba (MINTUR).  The following countries sent teams with a total of 78 competitors to compete - Argentina, Belgium, Brazil, Cuba, Croatia, Denmark, France, Germany, Italy, Mexico, Norway, Portugal, Spain, Slovenia, South Korea, Sweden, the Netherlands and Turkey.

The following photographic categories were used for this championship: fish, close-up with a theme, close-up (without a theme), wide angle (without diver) and wide angle with diver.

Results

Top ten competitors

Top ten fish

Top ten close-up with a theme

Top ten close-up

Top ten wide angle

Top ten wide angle with diver

References

External links
14th CMAS Underwater Photography World Championship Cuba - video by Corne Bolders

Underwater photography (sport)